Stetson is a town in Penobscot County, Maine, United States. The population was 1,186 at the 2020 census. It was named after its first proprietor, Amasa Stetson. His brother Simeon Stetson originally settled here as well, but moved to nearby Hampden in 1803. Simeon's sons Charles, George, and Isaiah founded a powerful mercantile and political family in Bangor.

Geography

Historic building

The Stetson Union Church (1843), designed in the Greek Revival style by Bangor architect Benjamin S. Deane, is listed on the National Register of Historic Places.

Demographics

2010 census
As of the census of 2010, there were 1,202 people, 479 households, and 344 families living in the town. The racial makeup of the town was 98.0% White, 0.1% African American, 0.6% Native American, 0.2% Asian, and 1.1% from two or more races. Hispanic or Latino of any race were 0.9% of the population.

There were 479 households, of which 29.9% had children under the age of 18 living with them, 59.1% were married couples living together, 6.9% had a female householder with no husband present, 5.8% had a male householder with no wife present, and 28.2% were non-families. 21.1% of all households were made up of individuals, and 6.7% had someone living alone who was 65 years of age or older. The average household size was 2.51 and the average family size was 2.90.

The median age in the town was 41.6 years. 22.3% of residents were under the age of 18; 6.4% were between the ages of 18 and 24; 26.1% were from 25 to 44; 31.1% were from 45 to 64; and 14% were 65 years of age or older. The gender makeup of the town was 50.0% male and 50.0% female.

2000 census
As of the census of 2000, there were 981 people, 383 households, and 273 families living in the town. There were 513 housing units at an average density of 14.7 per square mile (5.7/km). The racial makeup of the town was 98.67% White, 0.20% African American, 0.51% Native American, and 0.61% from two or more races.

There were 383 households, out of which 33.2% had children under the age of 18 living with them, 60.1% were married couples living together, 7.0% had a female householder with no husband present, and 28.7% were non-families. 21.1% of all households were made up of individuals, and 7.3% had someone living alone who was 65 years of age or older.  The average household size was 2.56 and the average family size was 2.95.

In the town, the population was spread out, with 26.3% under the age of 18, 7.6% from 18 to 24, 30.1% from 25 to 44, 26.7% from 45 to 64, and 9.3% who were 65 years of age or older.  The median age was 37 years. For every 100 females, there were 102.3 males.  For every 100 females age 18 and over, there were 102.0 males.

The median income for a household in the town was $30,606, and the median income for a family was $32,337. Males had a median income of $24,583 versus $20,724 for females. The per capita income for the town was $13,626.  About 12.7% of families and 17.5% of the population were below the poverty line, including 27.8% of those under age 18 and 16.3% of those age 65 or over.

References

External links
Town of Stetson official website

Towns in Penobscot County, Maine
Towns in Maine